Unicorn catleyi is a species of spider in the family Oonopidae, found in Chile and Argentina.

References

Oonopidae
Spiders of South America
Fauna of the Andes
Arthropods of Argentina
Arthropods of Chile
Spiders described in 1995